Émile-Paul Frères was a French publishing house, whose origins date back to 1881. 'Frères' is French for 'Brothers'. The brand was created by two brothers, Albert and Robert Paul, the sons of the founder Émile Paul. It was active until 1955, before disappearing in 1982. It was the first publisher of Alain-Fournier's Le Grand Meaulnes.

References

Sources
 Pascal Fouché, L’Édition française sous l’Occupation 1940-1944, Bibliothèque de littérature française contemporaine de l'université Paris 7, 1987-1988 ; reissue Éditions de l’IMEC, 2 volumes, 2005 .
 « Émile-Paul Frères », by Marie-Gabrielle Slama in P. Fouché et al. (direction) Dictionnaire encyclopédique du livre, Paris, Le Cercle de la librairie, 2005, volume 2, .
 Jean-Yves Mollier, Édition, presse et pouvoir en France au XXe siècle, Paris, Fayard, 2008 .

Book publishing companies of France
1881 establishments in France
1913 establishments in France
Publishing companies established in 1881
Publishing companies established in 1913
Defunct publishing companies